Jockeys is an American documentary sports reality television series that premiered on February 6, 2009 on Animal Planet. The series chronicles the professional lives of jockeys during the famous thirty-day Oak Tree Meet at Santa Anita Park. First and second season episodes aired on Friday nights. Trevor Denman is the show's host.

The second season, which premiered on August 21, 2009 added Corey Nakatani and Garrett Gomez to the featured jockeys while Jon Court departed to race in Kentucky.

The taglines of the show are:
"Win or Die Trying" for season 1 and
"To Win It All You Have to Risk It All" for season 2.

"Stronger" by Kanye West is used as the theme song.

Featured jockeys

Main
Mike E. Smith – A veteran and Hall of Fame jockey
Chantal Sutherland – Her move from Canada to California to continue her relationship with Mike Smith serves as a dramatic subplot in the series. Sutherland's struggles as a female jockey trying to break into a man's world is a key plot point.
Joe Talamo – A young and successful jockey.  The series chronicles how he handles success at a young age.
Aaron Gryder – A veteran hard-working family man who has never won the big race but continues to press on.
Jon Court – A 30-year veteran still chasing his dreams.
Kayla Stra – A young Australian trying to break into the US racing world.
Alex Solis – Solis is trying to recover from a broken back injury.
Corey Nakatani – Breaks his collarbone in a fall early in the Oak Tree Meet in Season 1. His comeback his chronicled in Season 2.
Garrett Gomez – Featured in the various episodes in Season 1 and was introduced as the nation's hottest jockey. He becomes a featured jockey in Season 2.

Other
Iggy Puglisi – While not billed as a featured jockey in the series, Puglisi is a major focus in Season 2's second episode as he attempts to come back from a broken back injury.
Brandon Meier – Brandon is the son of successful jockey Randall Meier.
Gary Stevens – Featured in various episodes, he rides in the Jockey Living Legends race
Sandy Hawley – Hawley wins the Jockey Living Legends race aboard Tribal Chief.
Julie Krone – Featured in the Jockey Living Legends episode, Krone's status as the world's best female jockey is juxtaposed against Chantal's storyline.
Angel Cordero Jr – Featured in the Jockey Living Legends episode.
Pat Day, featured in the Jockey Living Legends episode.
Rafael Bejarano – Featured in various episodes.
Eibar Coa, cameos in the first two episodes.
Edgar Prado – Cameos in the first two episodes.

Episodes

Season 1 (2009)

Season 2 (2009)

External links 

 
 

Animal Planet original programming
2000s American documentary television series
2009 American television series debuts
2009 American television series endings